Piper Joy Curda (born August 16, 1997) is an American actress and singer. She had her breakthrough with Disney Channel, portraying Kennedy in the comedy series A.N.T. Farm (2013–2014), Jasmine in the sitcom I Didn't Do It (2014–2015) and Alyssa in the comedy-television film Teen Beach 2 (2015). She subsequently transitioned to mainstream acting with the miniseries Youth & Consequences (2018), where she played Grace Ho. Curda led the horror film The Wretched (2020), starring as Mallory, which was a critical and commercial success.

Early life and education
Curda was born to U.S. Army Brig. Gen. Stephen K. Curda and Dr. Leslie Curda in Tallahassee, Florida, but was raised in Chicago. Her father is the first Korean-American to reach the rank of one-star general in the United States Army Reserve. Her mother is Scottish. She has four siblings: Riley, with whom she appeared in the musical The King and I; Major, who has appeared in Riverdale, Atypical, and The Thundermans; Glory, who has appeared in Final Fantasy VII Remake, Adventure Time, and Law & Order: Special Victims Unit; and Saylor, who stars as Maddox "Gadget" in the third season of High School Musical: The Musical: The Series. Curda attended Wheaton College in Wheaton, Illinois, from which she graduated in 2019.

Career 
At age 12, Curda played Roly-Poly in the Broadway national tour of The 101 Dalmatians Musical.  In 2011, she starred as Casey in the Disney.com series Rule the Mix. She also made numerous guest appearances in TV series including Law & Order: Special Victims Unit, Body of Proof and Malibu Country, and had a recurring role on A.N.T. Farm during its third season.

In June 2013, she landed a main role as Jasmine in the Disney Channel sitcom I Didn't Do It, which started airing in January 2014 and ended the following year in October.  In September 2013, she also appeared in a short film from Wong Fu Productions, Who pays on a first date? – Save the Date. She appeared as Alyssa in Teen Beach 2, the sequel to 2013's Teen Beach Movie.

She released her first single "Losing You" on January 15, 2014, and the music video on January 27, 2014.

In 2018, she starred as Grace Ho in Anna Akana's YouTube Red series Youth & Consequences.

In 2020, she starred in the horror film The Wretched.

Filmography

Film

Television

Discography

References

External links
 
 

1997 births
Actresses from Chicago
American child actresses
American film actresses
American television actresses
Living people
21st-century American actresses
American actresses of Korean descent
American people of Scottish descent